National Iranian Oil Refining and Distribution Company (NIORDC) is part of the Ministry of Petroleum of Iran. NIORDC was established on 8 March 1991 and undertook to perform all operations relating to refining and distribution of oil products.

Although NIORDC was formed in the 1990s, the company has actually inherited 90 years of Iran’s oil industries' experiences in the fields of refining, transfer and distribution of oil products, as well as, engineering and construction of installations of oil industries.

Responsibilities and duties (as of 2009)
Refining crude oil and producing a variety of oil products.
Transferring crude oil from production bases and “Khazar Terminal” to the refineries and also transferring oil products from refineries and import bases to distribution procurement depots and distribution centres.
Performing all refining projects and schemes, transfer and storing.
Providing different sectors – industry, agriculture and power plants – with fuel and feed regularly e.g. petrochemical complexes.
Providing consuming fuel to residential sector, business sector in urban and the peasantry communities all over the country.
Providing more than 7 million vehicles – heavy and light – in the transportation sector with their required daily fuel.

Installations and capabilities

As of 2010, NIORDC had 19 subsidiaries and affiliated companies, including 9 oil existing refineries.

Other facilities:
Fourteen thousand kilometers of crude oil and oil product transfer pipelines.
150 pumping stations.
Oil industry telecommunication network.
Operational zones for pipelines and telecommunication.
35 operational zones for NIOPDC.
220 operational areas for NIOPDC.
Storage tank installations with  capacity (2009).

Fuel imports

Major gasoline suppliers to Iran historically have been India, Turkmenistan, Azerbaijan, the Netherlands, France, Singapore, and the United Arab Emirates. The Financial Times reported that Vitol, Glencore, Trafigura and other (western) companies had since stopped supplying petrol to Iran because of international sanctions. In 2006, Vitol, a MNC based in Switzerland, supplied Iran with 60% of its total gasoline cargo imports.

In 2008 Iran has imported nearly 40% of its market needs because of lack of refining capacity and contraband.
In 2009, Iran spent paid $11 billion on imported fuel.
In September 2010, Iran claimed that it has stopped importing gasoline according to the domestic capacity expansion plans. This statement was later denied by the government of Hassan Rouhani. 
In 2014 Iran will import  of gasoline per day overall, including  of premium gasoline from India per day because some of the gasoline produced domestically does not meet the Euro-5 quality standards (and also because of the fuel smuggling/price differential with neighboring countries.)

New facilities

While the country remains dependent on small gasoline and diesel imports, net gasoline imports in 2013 averaged only 33 000 bpd. This compares to refined product imports of 182 000 bpd in 2009, of which two thirds was gasoline (approximately 132 000 bpd).

Planned in 2011, Qeshm refinery (capable of processing heavy crude oil) will have an output capacity of 30,000 barrels a day of light oil products and will become operational by 2014.

Policy
Providing desirable fuel supplying services and supplying feed of industries and factories all over the country in due time.
Reducing consumption rate through employing energy consumption management and raising export rate to make foreign currency.
Reducing waste materials through improving efficiency in refining and distribution system.
Reducing environment pollution to reach stable development.
Raising human force productivity and promoting level of training.
Increasing output of refinery facilities and transfer are distribution of oil products.
Reducing cost of production, transfer and distribution of oil products.

Subsidiary companies

The NIORDC subsidiaries are as follows:

National Iranian Oil Products Distribution Co.
Management of Construction & Development of "CNG" Stations Co.
National Iranian Oil Engineering and Construction Co. (NIOEC)
Oil Pipeline and Telecommunication Co.
Oil Refining Co.

See also

The nationalization of the Iran oil industry movement
Petroleum industry in Iran
Abadan Refinery
Arvand oil refinery
List of oil refineries
2007 Gas Rationing Plan in Iran
National Iranian Oil Company
Jey Oil Refining Company

References

External links
 Official NIORDC Website
Iran's Refinery Expansion Projects

Oil and gas companies of Iran
Government agencies established in 1991
1991 establishments in Iran